George A. French (March 19, 1901 – February 8, 1992) was an American lawyer and politician.

French was born in Hartford, Connecticut and graduated from West High School in Minneapolis, Minnesota. French received his bachelor's degree in engineering from University of Minnesota and his law degree from University of Minnesota Law School in 1927. He was admitted to the Minnesota bar and practiced law in Minneapolis. French lived in Minneapolis with his wife and family. He served in the Minnesota House of Representatives from 1941 to 1966 and was a Republican. French died from a heart attack at Memorial Hospital in St, Louis Park, Minnesota. The funeral and burial was in Minneapolis.

References

1901 births
1992 deaths
Lawyers from Minneapolis
Politicians from Hartford, Connecticut
Politicians from Minneapolis
University of Minnesota alumni
University of Minnesota Law School alumni
Republican Party members of the Minnesota House of Representatives